Franklin Field  is a county-owned public-use airport in Bullock County, Alabama, United States. It is located five nautical miles (5.8 mi, 9.3 km) west of the central business district of Union Springs, Alabama. It is included in the FAA's National Plan of Integrated Airport Systems for 2011–2015, which categorized it as a general aviation facility.

Facilities and aircraft 
It has one runway designated 14/32 with an asphalt surface measuring 5,000 by 80 feet (1,116 x 24 m). For the 12-month period ending November 19, 2010, the airport had 6,545 general aviation aircraft operations, an average of 17 per day.

References

External links 
 Aerial image as of 16 January 1992 from USGS The National Map

Airports in Alabama
Transportation buildings and structures in Bullock County, Alabama